"Da Butt" is a single released in 1988 from the original soundtrack to the film School Daze.  The song was written by Marcus Miller and performed by the D.C.-based go-go band E.U.  The song reached number one on the Billboard's Hot Black Singles chart for the week of April 23, 1988, and was ranked #61 on VH1's 100 Greatest One Hit Wonders of the 80s. The music video was directed by Spike Lee.

During the 93rd Academy Awards, actress Glenn Close danced to the song. In response, Gregory "Sugar Bear" Elliot of E.U. reacted by stating it was like winning a lottery ticket.

Track listing
 12" single
"Da Butt" (radio mix) – 6:20
"Da Butt" (B'Boy dub) – 5:23
"Da Butt" (extended version) – 5:09  
"Da Butt" (7" version) – 3:54

 7" single
"Da Butt" (7" version) – 3:54
"Da Butt" (B'Boy dub) – 5:23

Chart performance

References

External links
 Da Butt at "Discogs"

1988 songs
1988 singles
EMI America Records singles
Experience Unlimited songs
Songs written by Marcus Miller
Song recordings produced by Marcus Miller
Music videos directed by Spike Lee